Hawking (also known as Hawking: Brief History of Mine) is a 2013 biographical documentary film about Stephen Hawking directed by Stephen Finnigan and features Hawking himself, depicting his love life, his struggle with amyotrophic lateral sclerosis and his later recognition as a world-famous scientist.

Cast
Interviews are conducted with Jane Wilde Hawking, Kip Thorne, Benedict Cumberbatch, Buzz Aldrin, Jim Carrey, Richard Branson, members of Hawking's family and colleagues, and several others.
 Stephen Hawking as himself (narrating via his Equalizer computerized voice)
 Nathan Chapple as Stephen Hawking (young adult)
 Martin King as Stephen Hawking (adult)
 Joe Lovell as Stephen Hawking (adult)
 Tina Lovell as Jane Hawking
 Finlay Macrae as Stephen Hawking (teenager)
 Tanya O'Regan as Jane Hawking
 Arthur Pelling as Stephen Hawking (child)
 Walt Woltosz as himself

See also
 Hawking (2004 film), featuring Benedict Cumberbatch as Hawking
 The Theory of Everything (2014 film), starring Eddie Redmayne as Hawking

References

External links
 
 
  .

2013 films
2013 documentary films
British documentary films
Documentary films about people with motor neuron disease
Films about paraplegics or quadriplegics
Vertigo Films films
Cultural depictions of Stephen Hawking
2010s English-language films
2010s British films